The 1955 Arizona Wildcats baseball team represented the University of Arizona in the 1955 NCAA baseball season. The Wildcats played their home games at UA Field. The team was coached by Frank Sancet in his 6th year at Arizona.

The Wildcats won the District VI Playoff to advanced to the College World Series, where they were defeated by the Oklahoma A&M Cowboys.

Roster

Schedule 

! style="" | Regular Season
|- valign="top" 

|- align="center" bgcolor="#ccffcc"
| 1 || March 5 || Darr Aero Tech || UA Field • Tucson, Arizona || 12–3 || 1–0 || –
|- align="center" bgcolor="#ccffcc"
| 2 || March 11 ||  || UA Field • Tucson, Arizona || 7–4 || 2–0 || –
|- align="center" bgcolor="#ccffcc"
| 3 || March 12 || Sul Ross || UA Field • Tucson, Arizona || 23–1 || 3–0 || –
|- align="center" bgcolor="#ccffcc"
| 4 || March 17 || Marine Corps Base Camp Pendleton || UA Field • Tucson, Arizona || 11–5 || 4–0 || –
|- align="center" bgcolor="#ccffcc"
| 5 || March 18 || Marine Corps Base Camp Pendleton || UA Field • Tucson, Arizona || 7–6 || 5–0 || –
|- align="center" bgcolor="#ccffcc"
| 6 || March 19 ||  || UA Field • Tucson, Arizona || 15–12 || 6–0 || –
|- align="center" bgcolor="#ccffcc"
| 7 || March 21 ||  || UA Field • Tucson, Arizona || 14–2 || 7–0 || –
|- align="center" bgcolor="#ccffcc"
| 8 || March 22 || Utah || UA Field • Tucson, Arizona || 3–2 || 8–0 || –
|- align="center" bgcolor="#ccffcc"
| 9 || March 23 || Utah || UA Field • Tucson, Arizona || 13–6 || 9–0 || –
|- align="center" bgcolor="#ccffcc"
| 10 || March 24 || Utah || UA Field • Tucson, Arizona || 13–4 || 10–0 || –
|- align="center" bgcolor="#ccffcc"
| 11 || March 25 || Utah || UA Field • Tucson, Arizona || 5–4 || 11–0 || –
|- align="center" bgcolor="#ccffcc"
| 12 || March 28 ||  || UA Field • Tucson, Arizona || 8–4 || 12–0 || –
|- align="center" bgcolor="#ffcccc"
| 13 || March 29 || Wyoming || UA Field • Tucson, Arizona || 5–15 || 12–1 || –
|- align="center" bgcolor="#ccffcc"
| 14 || March 30 || Wyoming || UA Field • Tucson, Arizona || 9–0 || 13–1 || –
|-

|- align="center" bgcolor="#ccffcc"
| 15 || April 1 ||  || UA Field • Tucson, Arizona || 29–3 || 14–1 || 1–0
|- align="center" bgcolor="#ccffcc"
| 16 || April 2 || New Mexico A&M || UA Field • Tucson, Arizona || 11–1 || 15–1 || 2–0
|- align="center" bgcolor="#ccffcc"
| 17 || April 4 ||  || UA Field • Tucson, Arizona || 6–5 || 16–1 || 2–0
|- align="center" bgcolor="#ccffcc"
| 18 || April 5 || Iowa || UA Field • Tucson, Arizona || 27–7 || 17–1 || 2–0
|- align="center" bgcolor="#ccffcc"
| 19 || April 6 || Iowa || UA Field • Tucson, Arizona || 3–2 || 18–1 || 2–0
|- align="center" bgcolor="#ccffcc"
| 20 || April 7 || Iowa || UA Field • Tucson, Arizona || 7–6 || 19–1 || 2–0
|- align="center" bgcolor="#ffcccc"
| 21 || April 9 || Iowa || UA Field • Tucson, Arizona || 17–18 || 19–2 || 2–0
|- align="center" bgcolor="#ccffcc"
| 22 || April 9 || Iowa || UA Field • Tucson, Arizona || 4–1 || 20–2 || 2–0
|- align="center" bgcolor="#ccffcc"
| 23 || April 11 || at Pepperdine || Unknown • Malibu, California || 7–5 || 21–2 || 2–0
|- align="center" bgcolor="#ffcccc"
| 24 || April 12 || at  || Joe E. Brown Field • Los Angeles, California || 2–9 || 21–3 || 2–0
|- align="center" bgcolor="#ffcccc"
| 25 || April 12 || at  || Unknown • Fresno, California || 2–4 || 21–4 || 2–0
|- align="center" bgcolor="#ccffcc"
| 26 || April 13 || at Fresno State || Unknown • Fresno, California || 6–2 || 22–4 || 2–0
|- align="center" bgcolor="#ccffcc"
| 27 || April 15 || at  || Billy Hebert Field • Stockton, California || 7–4 || 23–4 || 2–0
|- align="center" bgcolor="#ccffcc"
| 28 || April 16 || at Pacific || Billy Hebert Field • Tucson, Arizona || 13–4 || 24–4 || 2–0
|- align="center" bgcolor="#ccffcc"
| 29 || April 20 || Davis–Monthan Air Force Base || UA Field • Tucson, Arizona || 25–3 || 25–4 || 2–0
|- align="center" bgcolor="#ccffcc"
| 30 || April 23 || at  || Unknown • Tempe, Arizona || 8–3 || 26–4 || 3–0
|- align="center" bgcolor="#ccffcc"
| 31 || April 23 || at Arizona State || Unknown • Tempe, Arizona || 4–0 || 27–4 || 4–0
|- align="center" bgcolor="#ccffcc"
| 32 || April 26 || Davis–Monthan Air Force Base || UA Field • Tucson, Arizona || 2–1 || 28–4 || 4–0
|- align="center" bgcolor="#ccffcc"
| 33 || April 28 || Naval Training Center || UA Field • Tucson, Arizona || 18–0 || 29–4 || 4–0
|- align="center" bgcolor="#ffcccc"
| 34 || April 29 || Naval Training Center || UA Field • Tucson, Arizona || 5–6 || 29–5 || 4–0
|- align="center" bgcolor="#ccffcc"
| 35 || April 30 || Naval Training Center || UA Field • Tucson, Arizona || 8–2 || 30–5 || 4–0
|-

|- align="center" bgcolor="#ccffcc"
| 36 || May 2 || Naval Training Center || UA Field • Tucson, Arizona || 5–4 || 31–5 || 4–0
|- align="center" bgcolor="#ccffcc"
| 37 || May 3 || Naval Training Center || UA Field • Tucson, Arizona || 7–0 || 32–5 || 4–0
|- align="center" bgcolor="#ccffcc"
| 38 || May 4 || Naval Training Center || UA Field • Tucson, Arizona || 12–4 || 33–5 || 4–0
|- align="center" bgcolor="#ccffcc"
| 39 || May 6 || Arizona State || UA Field • Tucson, Arizona || 4–1 || 34–5 || 5–0
|- align="center" bgcolor="#ccffcc"
| 40 || May 6 || Arizona State || UA Field • Tucson, Arizona || 5–0 || 35–5 || 6–0
|- align="center" bgcolor="#ccffcc"
| 41 || May 10 || Davis–Monthan Air Force Base || UA Field • Tucson, Arizona || 9–2 || 36–5 || 6–0
|- align="center" bgcolor="#ccffcc"
| 42 || May 15 || Hayden || UA Field • Tucson, Arizona || 15–8 || 37–5 || 6–0
|-

|-
! style="" | Postseason
|- valign="top"

|- align="center" bgcolor="#ccffcc"
| 43 || May 30 || at  || Kyle Baseball Field • College Station, Texas || 6–2 || 38–5 || 6–0
|- align="center" bgcolor="#ffcccc"
| 44 || May 31 || at Texas A&M || Kyle Baseball Field • College Station, Texas || 0–5 || 38–6 || 6–0
|- align="center" bgcolor="#ccffcc"
| 45 || June 1 || at Texas A&M || Kyle Baseball Field • College Station, Texas || 2–1 || 39–6 || 6–0
|-

|- align="center" bgcolor="#ffcccc"
| 46 || June 10 || vs Western Michigan || Omaha Municipal Stadium • Omaha, Nebraska || 1–4 || 39–7 || 6–0
|- align="center" bgcolor="#ccffcc"
| 47 || June 11 || vs Springfield || Johnny Rosenblatt Stadium • Omaha, Nebraska || 6–0 || 40–7 || 6–0
|- align="center" bgcolor="#ccffcc"
| 48 || June 13 || vs Colorado State || Johnny Rosenblatt Stadium • Omaha, Nebraska || 20–0 || 41–7 || 6–0
|- align="center" bgcolor="#ffcccc"
| 49 || June 14 || vs  || Johnny Rosenblatt Stadium • Omaha, Nebraska || 4–5 || 41–8 || 6–0
|-

Awards and honors 
Russ Gragg
Second Team All-American American Baseball Coaches Association

Craig Sorensen
Third Team All-American American Baseball Coaches Association

Carl Thomas
First Team All-American American Baseball Coaches Association

References 

Arizona Wildcats baseball seasons
Arizona Wildcats baseball
College World Series seasons
Arizona